The 2020 São Paulo municipal election took place in the city of São Paulo, Brazil, with the first round taking place on 15 November 2020 and the second round taking place on 29 November 2020. Voters voted to elect the Mayor, the Vice Mayor and 55 city councillors for the administration of the city. The result was a 2nd round victory for incumbent Mayor Bruno Covas of the Brazilian Social Democratic Party (PSDB), winning 3,169,121 votes and a share of 59,38% of the popular vote, defeating political activist Guilherme Boulos of the Socialism and Liberty Party (PSOL), who took 2,168,109 votes and a share of 40.62% of the popular vote.

Background 
In the 2016 São Paulo mayoral election, João Doria of the Brazilian Social Democratic Party (PSDB) was elected Mayor of São Paulo in first round with a share of 53,29% of the popular vote, defeating then incumbent Mayor Fernando Haddad, of the Workers' Party (PT). Later, Doria resigned to run for governor of the State of São Paulo in the 2018 São Paulo gubernatorial election against then incumbent governor Márcio França, leaving his Vice Mayor Bruno Covas to assume as Mayor of São Paulo. While facing cancer since October 2019, Covas was nevertheless confirmed as candidate for the Brazilian Social Democratic Party (PSDB) for reelection.

Other candidates 
A traditional runner in the mayoral elections and federal deputy for the State of São Paulo, Celso Russomanno of the Republicanos, was endorsed by incumbent President Jair Bolsonaro as a more aligned candidate to his government, in opposition to Covas' coalition and somewhat opposition to the government, particularly in his handling of the Coronavirus Pandemic.

The election would see the rise of well known and famous political and social activist Guilherme Boulos, who had previously disputed the 2018 Brazilian general election as a presidential candidate and who now had been elected in the primaries of the Socialism and Liberty Party (PSOL) to run as their candidate for the city of São Paulo. Slowly, he would rise to become the dominant left-wing opponent to Covas' more ideologically broad coalition of voters and Russomano's base of Bolsonaro's supporters. He would later become the front-runner in the second round alongside Covas.

Similarly to Boulos' profile, the election would also see the rise of political YouTuber and influencer Arthur do Val, known by his pseudonym "Mamãefalei" and YouTube channel of the same name, who had previously been elected in the 2018 São Paulo gubernatorial election as state deputy. He ran on a platform of right-wing liberal economic policies to revitalize and embellish São Paulo's town center and proposals to dealing with the "Cracolândia" area of São Paulo, known for its high incidence of drug trafficking and drug use. He was endorsed to run for the Patriota in a broad opposition to both Boulos' left-wing, Covas' coalition and Russomanos' base of Bolsonaro supporters.

Former governor of the State of São Paulo Márcio França, who had lost reelection in the 2018 São Paulo gubernatorial election to João Doria, was endorsed to run as the candidate for the Brazilian Socialist Party (PSB). He ran on a moderate and traditional social democratic platform. Among his proposals he defended free bus tickets during Sundays and holidays, as well as a reduction of the working time to 6 hours a day, and 3 working days during the week.

The Worker's Party (PT), struggling to maintain leadership ever since the impeachment of former president Dilma Rousseff, decided to seek out for a new figure and endorsed Jilmar Tatto as their candidate. He also ran as a traditional social democrat. Among his proposals were an increase to property tax for the rich, and creation of a communication channel for the city's government, which would serve as its official broadcasting service on news agencies, TV and public newsletters.

Among other lesser known candidates were Joice Hasselmann (PSL), Andrea Matarazzo (PSD), Marina Helou (REDE), Levy Fidelix (PRTB), Orlando Silva (PCdoB), Antonio Carlos (PCO) and Vera Lúcia (PSTU).

Extinction of Sabarás' candidacy 
Filipe Sabará was nominated candidate for the New Party (NOVO), but later he would be expelled from the party due to alleged inconsistencies in his curriculum, violating the party's code of ethics. Ultimately, the Regional Electoral Tribunal of São Paulo, at the party's request, ruled to extinguish his candidacy and the end of his campaign after his vice candidate Maria Helena declined to continue running.

Impact of the COVID-19 Pandemic 
Amidst the COVID-19 Pandemic, the city recorded the highest abstention rate ever, with around 29.29% of voters abstaining from voting in the first round, and around 30,78% of voters abstaining from voting in the second round, also resulting in one of the lowest turnouts seen for the municipal elections of São Paulo.

Candidates

Candidates in runoff

Candidates failing to make runoff

Candidacy denied

Withdrawn candidates
 Antonio Carlos Mazzeo (PCB) – professor and writer.
 Gil Diniz – State Deputy of São Paulo since 2019.
 Henrique Meirelles (MDB) – State Secretary of Economy and Planning of São Paulo since 2019; Minister of Finances 2016–2018; President of the Central Bank of Brazil 2003–2011.
 José Luiz Datena (MDB) – Journalist and TV presenter.
 Vivian Mendes (UP) – President of Popular Unity in São Paulo since 2019.

Declined candidates
 Aloízio Mercadante (PT) – Minister of Education 2012–2014, 2015–2016; Chief of Staff of the Presidency 2014–2015; Ministry of Science, Technology and Innovation 2011–2012; Senator for São Paulo 2003–2011; Federal Deputy from São Paulo 1991–1995, 1999–2003.
 Ana Estela Haddad (PT) – First Lady of São Paulo 2013–2017.
 Fernando Haddad (PT) – Mayor of São Paulo 2013–2017; Minister of Education 2005–2012; candidate for Mayor of São Paulo in 2016; candidate for President of Brazil in 2018.
 Janaína Paschoal (PSL) – State Deputy of São Paulo since 2019.
 Tabata Amaral – Federal Deputy from São Paulo since 2019.

Lost in primaries or conventions
 Alexandre Padilha – Federal Deputy from São Paulo since 2019; Municipal Secretary of Health of São Paulo 2015–2017; Minister of Health 2011–2014; Secretary of Institutional Relations 2009–2010.
 Antônio Ribas Paiva (PTC) – Rural producer, entrepreneur and lawyer.
 Carlos Giannazi (PSOL) – State Deputy of São Paulo since 2007; City Councillor of São Paulo 2001–2007. Candidate for Mayor of São Paulo in 2012.
 Carlos Zarattini (PT) – Federal Deputy from São Paulo since 2007; State Deputy of São Paulo 1999–2003.
 Christian Lohbauer (NOVO) – political scientist and professor. Candidate for Vice President of Brazil in 2018.
 Eduardo Jorge (PV) – Federal Deputy from São Paulo 1987–2005; State Deputy of São Paulo 1983–1987. Candidate for President of Brazil in 2014.
 Eduardo Suplicy (PT) – City Councillor of São Paulo since 2017, 1989−1990; Senator for São Paulo 1991−2015; Federal Deputy from São Paulo 1983−1987; State Deputy of São Paulo 1979−1982.
 José Eduardo Cardozo (PT) – Attorney General of the Union 2016; Minister of Justice and Public Security 2011−2016; Federal Deputy from São Paulo 2003−2011; City Councillor of São Paulo 1995−2003.
 Kika da Silva (PT) – Activist.
 Luiz Antonio de Medeiros Neto (PDT) – Federal Deputy from São Paulo 1999–2007.
 Luiz Philippe of Orléans-Braganza (PSL) – Federal Deputy from São Paulo since 2019.
 Marta Suplicy (SD) – Senator for São Paulo 2011–2019; Minister of Culture 2012–2014; Minister of Tourism 2007–2008; Mayor of São Paulo 2001–2005; candidate for Mayor of São Paulo in 2004, 2008 and 2016.
 Nabil Bonduki (PT) – Municipal Secretary of Culture of São Paulo 2015–2016; City Councillor of São Paulo 2001–2005; 2013–2017.
 Nádia Campeão (PCdoB) – Vice Mayor of São Paulo 2013−2017; Municipal Secretary of Sports of São Paulo 2001−2005; candidate for Vice Governor in 2006.
 Nelson Marconi (PDT) – economist, Getúlio Vargas Foundation professor.
 Paulo Teixeira (PT) – Federal Deputy from São Paulo since 2007; City Councillor of São Paulo 2005–2007; Director-President of Metropolitan Housing Company of São Paulo (COHAB) 2003–2004; Municipal Secretary of Housing and Urban Development of São Paulo 2001–2004; State Deputy of São Paulo 1995–2001.
 Sâmia Bomfim (PSOL) – Federal Deputy from São Paulo since 2019; City Councillor of São Paulo 2017−2019.

Debates

Outgoing Municipal Chamber
The result of the last municipal election and the current situation in the Municipal Chamber is given below:

Opinion polls

First round

2020

Published after the campaign's start

Published before the campaign's start

2019

Second round

After the first round

Before the first round

Results

Mayor

Municipal Chamber

Notes

References

Mayoral elections in São Paulo
São Paulo
November 2020 events in Brazil
Elections postponed due to the COVID-19 pandemic